Chelsea Barracks was a British Army barracks located in the City of Westminster, London, between the districts of Belgravia, Chelsea and Pimlico on Chelsea Bridge Road.
The barracks closed in the late 2000s, and the site is currently being redeveloped for residential use by Qatari Diar, a subsidiary of the Qatar Investment Authority (QIA).

History

The original barracks, designed by George Morgan to house two battalions of infantry, were completed in 1862. The barracks comprised a long and monotonous brick structure broken by towers in the centre. The original arrangement included a chapel, which survives, and the interior of which includes pictures of King David, the Prophet Joshua, Saint John and Saint James, as well as some panels listing the names of soldiers killed in action. It is now a Grade II listed building.

In the late 1950s, the original buildings, excluding the chapel, were demolished, and in June 1960, construction started on two 13-storey concrete tower-blocks designed by Tripe and Wakeham, which were completed in 1962. The tower blocks were used to accommodate four companies from the Guards Regiments. A nail-bomb attack on the barracks by the Provisional Irish Republican Army in September 1981 killed two civilians and injured up to 50.

Development of the site

On 6 September 2005 Secretary of State for Defence, John Reid, announced that Chelsea Barracks would be sold. He described it as needing extensive renovations. The site was vacated in 2008 with the troops transferred to the Royal Artillery Barracks at Woolwich. The site was part of the Ministry of Defence's Project MoDEL that saw it and five other sites across London sold off, mainly for housing.

Westminster City Council published its draft planning brief for the Chelsea Barracks site in September 2006. It included a commitment to develop 50% of the site with affordable housing. A Community Forum was established by local residents in April 2006 with the support of Secretary of State for Work and Pensions, John Hutton MP, to campaign for greater transparency in the sale of the barracks site and for the 50% affordable homes commitment to be realised.

2007 sale
The barracks is in one of London's most expensive residential areas and was originally expected to sell for £250 million. In April 2007 the Ministry of Defence agreed to sell Chelsea Barracks in its  site for £959 million to a consortium consisting of Qatari Diar and the CPC Group. On 1 February 2008, the joint venture took possession of the site. Subsequently, CPC's interest in the joint venture company, Project Blue Ltd, was acquired by Qatari Diar, which now owns 100% of the site.

Withdrawn Richard Rogers scheme
In 2008, a proposed scheme for the barracks site - designed by Rogers Stirk Harbour + Partners - was submitted to Westminster Council. The masterplan was a contemporary design with series of copper, glass and concrete pavilions - with 638 residential units including 50% affordable units.

However, the proposal was criticised by Charles, Prince of Wales, who preferred a more traditional design for the site. The developers Qatari Diar subsequently withdrew the planning application in June 2009. Richard Rogers publicly criticised the Prince's intervention following the withdrawal.

In May 2010, some of the developers made an £81 million claim at the High Court, blaming Prince Charles for the withdrawal of a planning application. The claim was later reduced to £68 million. The High Court ruled that Qatari Diar breached a contract with developers CPC Group when it withdrew Richard Rogers' Chelsea Barracks scheme. The High Court handed a partial victory to property development firm CPC Group, who demanded compensation after plans to redevelop London's Chelsea Barracks were shelved. Christian and Nick Candy blamed an intervention by Prince Charles for giving their partners, Qatari Diar, cold feet.

New masterplan
A new masterplan - designed by Squire and Partners - was approved by Westminster Council in 2011. The site will be built over multiple phases over several years. The scheme will have 448 residential units including 123 affordable units (27%), as well as a new leisure centre, NHS medical centre, community centre and local shops.

In May 2014, Westminster Council granted detailed planning consent for the first phase of the scheme, consisting of 68 apartments across three eight-storey blocks and includes five new garden squares. Construction on this first phase began in 2015. Residents began to move into the development in October 2019.

References

External links
 Draft Planning Brief for Chelsea Barracks, SW1
 Chelsea Barracks Partnership
 Chelsea Barracks building information & photos

Barracks in London
Buildings and structures in the City of Westminster
Installations of the British Army
Military installations established in 1862
Military installations closed in 2008